Shanne Bradley (born 1957) is an English punk musician, songwriter, and artist. She founded a punk band The Nipple Erectors (The Nips) in 1976 playing bass guitar with Shane MacGowan on vocals, she co-founded The Men They Couldn't Hang in 1984. Bradley was also known as Shanne Skratch and briefly as Shanne Hasler.

Bands
 The Launderettes (1976) with Ray Pist and Chaotic Bass
 The Nipple Erectors/ The Nips (1976–1981, reformed in 2008) with Shane Macgowan. First performance in 1977 at The Roxy, London
 The Men They Couldn't Hang 1984–1987

Discography

Singles
 (1978)  "King of the Bop" - The Nipple Erectors also included on the NME compilation album Pogo A Go Go!
  (1978) "All the Time in the World" - The Nips
 (1979) "Gabrielle" - The Nips
 (1981) "Happy Song" - The Nips
 (1984) "The Green Fields Of France"- The Men They Couldn't Hang - 7" Demon Records IMP-003
 (1984) "The Green Fields Of France", "The Men They Couldn't Hang ", "Hush Little Baby" - The Men They Couldn't Hang - 12" Demon/IMP-003T
 (1985) "Ironmasters", "Rawhide" - The Men They Couldn't Hang - 7" Demon/IMP-005
 (1985) "Ironmasters", "Donald Where's Your Troosers", "Rawhide" - The Men They Couldn't Hang - 12" Demon/IMP-005T
 (1985) "Greenback Dollar", "Night To Remember" - The Men They Couldn't Hang - 7" Demon D-1040
 (1985) "Greenback Dollar", "The Bells", "Night To Remember", "Hell Or England" - The Men They Couldn't Hang - 12" Demon D-1040T12
 (1986) "Gold Rush" "The Ghosts Of Cable Street" - The Men They Couldn't Hang - 7" MCA-SELL-1
 (1986) "Gold Rush" "The Ghosts Of Cable Street" "Walkin' Talkin" - The Men They Couldn't Hang - 12"  MCA-SELL-T1
 (1986) "Shirt Of Blue" "Johnny Come Home (live)" " A Night To Remember (live)" - The Men They Couldn't Hang - 7"  MCA-SELL-2
 (1986) "Shirt Of Blue" "Johnny Come Home (live)" "A Night To Remember (live)" "Whiskey With Me Giro (live)" "Scarlet Ribbons (live)"  - The Men They Couldn't Hang - 12"  MCA-SELL-T2
 (1986) "Ghosts Of Cable Street" "Dream Machine" The Men They Couldn't Hang - 7" MCA-SELL-3
 (1986) "Ghosts Of Cable Street" "Dream Machine" "Liverpool Lullaby" - The Men They Couldn't Hang - 12" MCA-SELL-T3

Albums
(1987) Bops, Babes, Booze and Bovver  -  The Nipple Erectors posthumous singles compilation
(1980) Only the End of the Beginning  -  The Nipple Erectors live at Wolverhampton Poly. Purple Hearts tour
(1984) Don't Let The Hope Close Down - Various - Hope Springs Records- HOPE 1 B4 - included The Men They Couldn't Hang  - "Whiskey In Me Giro"
(1985) Night of a Thousand Candles -  The Men They Couldn't Hang LP Demon FIEND-050
(1987) Night of a Thousand Candles -  The Men They Couldn't Hang CD Demon FIENDCD-050
(1986) How Green Is The Valley -  The Men They Couldn't Hang - LP MCA 254 584-1 (MCF-3337)
(1986) How Green Is The Valley -  The Men They Couldn't Hang - CD MCA MCLD-19075
(1998) Majestic Grill: The Best Of The Men They Couldn't Hang - CD compilation Demon Records FIENDCD 940
(2007) Demos and Rarities Volume 1 - The Men They Couldn't Hang - Vinyl Star
(2009) Quiet Please - The New Best Of Nick Lowe -  Nick Lowe - Double CD, Compilation DVD, Yep Roc Records - YEP 2622; Country US CD1-25 - included "Wishing Well"

References

Sources
 Kiss My Arse - The Story Of The Pogues by Carol Clerk - Omnibus Press

External links
 The Official Nipple Erectors Myspace 
 The Nips: Licensed to Cool - a fan site
 Nipple Erectors biography at punk77.co.uk
 They Men They Couldn't Hang official site
 MySpace site The Men They Couldn't Hang
 John Peel Sessions

1957 births
Living people
English punk rock bass guitarists
English songwriters
Women bass guitarists
Musicians from London
The Nipple Erectors members
Women in punk